Darryl Marion Sydor (born May 13, 1972) is a Canadian-American former professional ice hockey defenceman. He won two Stanley Cups during his career: with the Dallas Stars in 1999, and with the Tampa Bay Lightning in 2004. He also reached the Stanley Cup Finals in 1993 as a member of the Los Angeles Kings, in 2000 as a member of the Dallas Stars and in 2008 as a member of the Pittsburgh Penguins. As a junior, Sydor won a Memorial Cup with the Kamloops Blazers and also represented Canada at the World Junior Championships.

Playing career
The Los Angeles Kings selected Sydor seventh overall in the 1990 NHL Entry Draft. He played four seasons with the Kamloops Blazers of the Western Hockey League (WHL) and won a Memorial Cup championship in 1992. Sydor originally began his Memorial Cup championship season in the National Hockey League (NHL) with the Kings, but was sent back to the WHL after 18 games.

In his first full season with the Kings, Sydor tallied 29 points and helped the club to their first ever Stanley Cup Finals appearance. Led by Wayne Gretzky, they were defeated by the Montreal Canadiens. Sydor developed with the Kings, but did not reach his prime until he was traded to the Dallas Stars in 1996. He recorded a career-high 40 assists and 48 points in 1996–97 with the Stars.

During his time with Dallas, Sydor became part of the team's "big four" defenceman, which included Derian Hatcher, Sergei Zubov and Richard Matvichuk. This quartet played a major role in capturing the Stanley Cup in 1999 against the Buffalo Sabres. In the regular season leading up to Sydor's first Stanley Cup championship, he matched his career-high 48 points and established a personal best 14 goals. The following year, Sydor helped the Stars to a second consecutive Finals appearance, but would suffer an injury against the New Jersey Devils. The Stars were kept from repeating as Stanley Cup champions, falling to the Devils in six games.

Sydor played in Dallas for seven-and-a-half seasons before being traded to the Columbus Blue Jackets in the summer of 2003. He played only 49 games with Columbus before being traded to the Tampa Bay Lightning in exchange for prospect Alexander Svitov midway through the season. Bolstering the Lightning's lineup for their 2004 playoff run, Sydor won his second Stanley Cup championship as the Lightning defeated the Calgary Flames in seven games. Sydor remained with the Lightning for one more season and was then traded back to the Dallas Stars on July 2, 2006, for a 2008 fourth-round draft pick in a salary-dumping move.

Returning to Dallas in 2006–07, he became an unrestricted free agent on July 1, 2007. Due to a late-season acquisition for defenceman Mattias Norström, Sydor became the odd man out on the Stars' blueline and did not receive an offer from the club. He instead signed a two-year, $5 million contract with the Pittsburgh Penguins. In his second season with the Penguins, he was traded back to Dallas for his third stint with the club on November 16, 2008, in exchange for Phillippe Boucher.

On September 3, 2009, Sydor was invited to the St. Louis Blues training camp for the 2009–10 season. On September 25, Sydor signed a one-year contract with the Blues, serving primarily as a seventh defenceman. He announced his retirement from the NHL as a player on July 13, 2010.

Coaching career
Sydor spent the 2010–11 season as an assistant coach of the Houston Aeros of the American Hockey League (AHL) under head coach Mike Yeo. Under their leadership, the Aeros won the Western Conference title. On June 30, 2011, Sydor was announced as one of the new assistant coaches of the NHL's Minnesota Wild, again serving under Yeo. When Yeo became the head coach of the St. Louis Blues, Sydor again followed, working with the Blues' AHL affiliate Chicago Wolves in 2016–17 and as a Blues' assistant coach in 2017–18. He left the Blues in 2018 to spend more time with family.
On January 12, 2019, Sydor was hired as the assistant coach of the Kamloops Blazers of the Western Hockey League.

Awards
Won President's Cup (WHL champions; Kamloops Blazers) in 1990 and 1992.
 WHL West First All-Star Team – 1990, 1991 & 1992
Won Memorial Cup (CHL champions; Kamloops Blazers) in 1992.
Played in the NHL All-Star Game in 1998 and 1999.
Stanley Cup champion in 1999 (Dallas Stars) and 2004 (Tampa Bay Lightning).

Personal life
Sydor and his wife Sharlene have four sons: Parker, Braden, Dylan and Cooper. At the end of 2006, Sydor was naturalized with his wife as US citizens at a Dallas elementary school.

On August 21, 2015, Sydor was charged with drunken driving after police arrested him while he was driving his 12-year-old son to a hockey tournament. According to the criminal complaint filed in Anoka County District Court, Sydor's blood alcohol level tested at 0.30, more than three times the legal limit.

Sydor voluntarily entered the NHL/NHL Players' Association Substance Abuse/Behavioral Health Program and admitted himself into an inpatient centre in Malibu, California, on August 22 to seek treatment for alcoholism, earning the respect of fellow Blazers' majority owner Tom Gaglardi.

Sydor is a part owner of the Kamloops Blazers.

Career statistics

Regular season and playoffs

International

See also
List of NHL players with 1,000 games played

References

External links

1972 births
Canadian emigrants to the United States
Canadian ice hockey defencemen
Canadian people of Ukrainian descent
Columbus Blue Jackets players
Dallas Stars players
Ice hockey people from Edmonton
Kamloops Blazers players
Living people
Los Angeles Kings draft picks
Los Angeles Kings players
Minnesota Wild coaches
National Hockey League All-Stars
National Hockey League first-round draft picks
Pittsburgh Penguins players
St. Louis Blues players
Stanley Cup champions
Tampa Bay Lightning players
St. Louis Blues coaches
Canadian ice hockey coaches